Sir William Henry Milton (3 December 1854 – 6 March 1930) was the third Administrator of Mashonaland, played rugby for England and was South Africa's second Test cricket captain.

Born in Little Marlow, Buckinghamshire, and educated at Marlborough College, Milton played rugby for England in 1874 and 1875. He immigrated to South Africa, arriving in Cape Town in 1878. By the late 1870s, rugby football was very much battling to survive against Winchester College football. Milton joined the Villagers club and preached the cause of rugby, and by the end of that year the football fraternity of Cape Town had all but abandoned the Winchester game in favour of rugby.

He made his Test cricket debut in South Africa's first Test of all, at Port Elizabeth in 1888–89. He was made captain for the Second Test at Cape Town, replacing Owen Dunell, and made his third and final appearance (again at Cape Town) in 1891–92. He played three other first-class games: two for Western Province and one for Cape Town Clubs.

Milton then moved to Mashonaland and under the influence of his friend Cecil John Rhodes was Mashonaland's third Administrator from 24 July 1897 to 24 January 1901. In 1901, it was decided to combine the administration of Mashonaland and Matabeleland that had been separated three years before, and Milton then became the Administrator of the whole of Southern Rhodesia. He retired in 1914 at the age of 60. In 1922, the biggest school in Bulawayo at the time was renamed Milton High School in his honour.

He had three sons, Cecil and John, both of whom would play rugby for England, and Noel, who played for Oxford University. He died in Cannes, France, at the age of 75.

External links

1854 births
1930 deaths
Cricket players and officials awarded knighthoods
England international rugby union players
English rugby union players
Rugby union players from Buckinghamshire
Rugby union players in South Africa
South Africa Test cricket captains
South Africa Test cricketers
South African cricketers
Villager FC players
Western Province cricketers